Collimonas fungivorans is a species of bacteria in the Oxalobacteraceae family which has antifungal activity
 against Aspergillus niger, for example. C. fungivorans has the ability to grow on living fungal hyphae.

References

External links
Type strain of Collimonas fungivorans at BacDive -  the Bacterial Diversity Metadatabase

Burkholderiales
Bacteria described in 2004